A Life Worth Living is the sixth studio album by Marc Broussard.

Following the release of a live album/DVD Live at Full Sail University in 2013, and re-signing with Vanguard Records (who released his S.O.S.: Save Our Soul album in 2007), Broussard set to release his new studio album in 2014. The album cover was unveiled on May 13, 2014, and the set's first single "Hurricane Heart" premiered on May 19, 2014. The album was released on July 29, 2014.

Track listing
"Hurricane Heart"
"Dying Man"
"Perfect To Me"
"Man Ain't Supposed To Cry"
"Edge of Heaven"
"A Life Worth Living"
"Honesty"
"Another Day"
"Weight of the World"
"Shine"
"Give Em Hell"
"I'll Never Know"

Personnel
 Phil Allen - bass guitar, drums, acoustic guitar, electric guitar, mandolin, percussion
 Jeff Babko - piano
 Marc Broussard - acoustic guitar, electric guitar, piano, lead vocals
 Tom Bukovac - acoustic guitar, electric guitar
 Chad Gilmore - drums
 Johnny Haro - drums
 Warren Huart - acoustic guitar, electric guitar, mandolin, piano, slide guitar
 Tim Lauer - piano
 Tony Lucido - bass guitar
 Steve Maggiora - keyboards, piano
 Paul Moak - accordion, bass guitar, acoustic guitar, electric guitar, Hammond B-3 organ, pedal steel guitar, percussion, piano, vibraphone, background vocals
 Tim Pierce - bass guitar, electric guitar
 Genevieve Schatz - background vocals
 Devin Vaughan - drums, percussion

Singles
"Hurricane Heart" was released on May 19, 2014 on Broussard's official Soundcloud account, and was used in promos for the MissUSA pageant on NBC, of which Broussard was a featured musical guest.

A music video for "Shine" premiered on USA Today's website on June 25, 2014.

Commercial performance
The album debuted at #85 on the Billboard Top 200 Albums Chart (Issue Date: August 16, 2014) and sold 3,600 in its debut week. It became his highest charting album to date.

References

2014 albums
Marc Broussard albums
Vanguard Records albums